Qwest Tower may refer to
 CenturyLink Tower (formerly Qwest Tower), the tallest building in Sioux Falls and the state of South Dakota
 Quest Tower, in Phoenix Plaza, 3rd tallest building in Phoenix

or either of the following skyscrapers in Denver, Colorado, USA:

 1801 California Street, the former world headquarters of Qwest
 555 17th Street, the Qwest headquarters from 1997 to 2000

See also 
 Qwest Building, a building in Minneapolis
 Qwest Field, in Seattle, Washington
 Qwest Center Omaha, in Omaha, Nebraska
 Qwest Arena, a multi-purpose arena in Boise, Idaho

Lumen Technologies